Events from the year 1653 in Ireland.

Incumbent
Lord Protector: Oliver Cromwell (from 16 December)

Events
January 6 – a law declares any Roman Catholic priest in Ireland to be guilty of treason.
April 27 – the last Irish forces (the remnants of the Confederate's Ulster Army, led by Philip O'Reilly) formally surrender at Cloughoughter in County Cavan to the Cromwellian army ending the Confederate Wars
September 26 – an act provides for transplanting all native Irish people into Connacht.
December 16 – Cromwell proclaimed Lord Protector of England, Scotland and Ireland.

Births
William Stewart, 1st Viscount Mountjoy, soldier (k. 1692)

Deaths
August
Phelim O'Neill, hanged in Dublin by the English Parliamentarians for his role in the Irish Rebellion of 1641 
Piaras Feiritéar, poet, hanged in Killarney by the English Parliamentarians for his role in the Rebellion of 1641.
Niall Ó Glacáin, physician (b. c.1563)
Hugh O'Reilly, Roman Catholic Archbishop of Armagh (b. c.1581)

References

 
1650s in Ireland
Ireland
Years of the 17th century in Ireland